Steve "Zetro" Souza (born March 24, 1964) is an American musician, best known for his work as lead vocalist with thrash metal band Exodus from 1986 to 1994, and again from 2002 to 2004. He rejoined Exodus for a third time in 2014. Souza is one of two singers, along with Chuck Billy, for the band Dublin Death Patrol. He also sings for the thrash metal band Tenet and was the lead singer for the thrash metal band Legacy (later known as Testament). In 2011, Souza announced his new project, Hatriot. He stepped down as the frontman of the band in 2015, leaving the role of lead vocals to his son, Cody.

Biography

Legacy/Testament
Before singing for Exodus, he was the lead singer for the band Legacy (which became Testament after his departure), recording and writing most of The Legacy demo. At the time of his departure from Legacy, he introduced Chuck Billy to Legacy members and joined Exodus.

Exodus

Souza is best known for his stints in Exodus, for whom he sang between 1986 and 1994 (when they broke up) after being brought in to replace Paul Baloff. Exodus was disbanded about two years after the release of Force of Habit. He later rejoined the reformed Exodus from 2002 to 2004. He again parted ways with the band during their South American tour later in 2004; according to Holt, Zetro bailed from the tour just as the tour was about to start. This caused the split to be fairly hostile; in retrospect, Zetro has admitted the blame for the circumstances, saying that it was his discontent at the time that caused the problems.

Thrash Against Cancer
Souza hosted the Thrash Against Cancer benefit in 2005 at The Pound in San Francisco, and appears onstage with Testament every time they play the Bay Area.

Dublin Death Patrol

In 2006, he and Chuck Billy formed Dublin Death Patrol, an American thrash metal band. Alongside Willy Lange (Lȧȧz Rockit). In 2007, they went on a world tour and did Fields of Rock in the Netherlands alongside Heaven & Hell, Korn, Iron Maiden, Ozzy Osbourne, Machine Head, Black Label Society, Hatebreed, Megadeth, Papa Roach, Slayer, Motörhead, Mastodon, Velvet Revolver, Dream Theater, Suicidal Tendencies, Amon Amarth, DragonForce, Ill Niño, and DevilDriver.

Tenet
In August 2008, Souza became the lead singer for the metal band TENET along with members Byron Stroud (Strapping Young Lad, Fear Factory, Zimmer's Hole), Jed Simon (Strapping Young Lad, Zimmer's Hole), Glen Alvelais (Testament, Forbidden) and Gene Hoglan (Death, Unearth, Dethklok, Strapping Young Lad, Dark Angel, Testament, Zimmer's Hole, Old Man's Child). The album was eventually released in July 2009.

Hatriot
Souza, along with fellow members Kosta Varvatakis, Justin Sakagawa, and his two sons Nicholas Souza and Cody Souza, started a thrash metal project called Hatriot. Hatriot released their debut album, Heroes of Origin, on January 25, 2013. The group's second album, Dawn of the New Centurion, was released on February 21, 2014 via Massacre Records. Steve eventually left Hatriot due to Exodus touring duties in 2015 and was succeeded by his son Cody.

Return to Exodus

On June 8, 2014, it was announced that Souza had rejoined Exodus. He appeared on Exodus' tenth studio album Blood In, Blood Out, which is his first album with the band since 2004's Tempo of the Damned.

Style
Souza's voice is reminiscent of AC/DC's former vocalist Bon Scott, and can be heard on the AC/DC covers that Exodus recorded, including "Overdose" on 1989's Fabulous Disaster, and "Dirty Deeds Done Dirt Cheap" on 2004's Tempo of the Damned.

Personal life
His nickname "Zetro" comes from a cartoon whale he saw in high school.

In a July 2018 interview, Souza called himself a supporter of President Donald Trump, as he cites the low unemployment rate and the meetings with North Korean leader Kim Jong-un being beneficial to the country. Regarding Kim, Zetro mentioned: "I think that's great – that's what you need to do. People need to touch together, not do it through channels".

Discography

With Testament
 Legacy Demo (1985)
 The Legacy (1987) (credited for writing six out of nine of the songs, but did not perform)
 First Strike Still Deadly (2001) (provides vocals for re-recordings of "Alone in the Dark" and "Reign of Terror")

With Exodus
 Pleasures of the Flesh (1987)
 Fabulous Disaster (1989)
 Impact Is Imminent (1990)
 Good Friendly Violent Fun (1991)
 Force of Habit (1992)
 Tempo of the Damned (2004)
 Blood In, Blood Out (2014)
 Persona Non Grata (2021)

With Dublin Death Patrol
 DDP 4 Life (2007)
 Death Sentence (2012)

With Tenet
Sovereign (2009)

With Hatriot
 Heroes of Origin (2013)
 Dawn of the New Centurion (2014)

References

External links

1964 births
American male singers
American heavy metal singers
American people of Portuguese descent
California Republicans
Exodus (American band) members
Living people